Names in Marble is an Estonian 2002 film directed by Elmo Nüganen. It is based on the novel of the same name written by Albert Kivikas in 1936 about the Estonian War of Independence fought in 1918–1920.

Plot summary
Despite peaceful speeches, the army of the Soviet Russian is attacking Estonia, and the country's government is declaring a mobilization for all. Henn Ahas, the son of a poor family, hesitates to go to war because he does not know whether he will follow his brother to the Red Guards or join the government forces alongside his schoolmates.

Ahas is unrelated to either, and is later captured by Red Guards forces, and in captivity, Ahas meets the young bourgeois girl Marta. Finnish officer Sulo Kallio, who is aiming for government forces, release Ahas and Marta, and they escape. On the escape route, Ahas must choose on whose side he fights.

Cast
 Henn Ahas – Priit Võigemast
 Ants Ahas – Indrek Sammul
 Marta – Hele Kõre
 Käsper – Alo Kõrve
 Tääker – Anti Reinthal
 Mugur – Ott Sepp
 Miljan – Mart Toome
 Martinson – Karol Kuntsel
 Kohlapuu – Ott Aardam
 Karakull – Guido Kangur
 Konsap – Argo Aadli 
 Käämer – Bert Raudsep
 Sulo Kallio – Peter Franzén 
 Captain – Jaan Tätte
 Militia unit leader – Hannes Kaljujärv
 Battalion commander (Karl Einbund) – Martin Veinmann

References

External links 
 
 

2002 films
Films set in Estonia
Estonian war drama films
Finnish war films
Films based on Estonian novels
Films directed by Elmo Nüganen
Films shot in Estonia